Mako Yoshikawa (born 1966) is an American novelist.  She is the author of two novels, One Hundred and One Ways (1999), a national bestseller that was also translated into six languages,  and Once Removed (2003).

Her recent work includes personal essays that have won awards and appeared in important literary journals and anthologies including: The Missouri Review, Southern Indiana Review, Harvard Review, and Best American Essays 2013.  Eds. Cheryl Strayed and Robert Atwan.

Yoshikawa grew up in Princeton, New Jersey but spent two years of her childhood in Tokyo, Japan.  She received a BA in English literature from Columbia University, a Masters in Shakespeare and Renaissance Drama at Lincoln College, Oxford, and a Ph.D. in English literature from the University of Michigan, Ann Arbor. She is the recipient of the Vera M. Schuyler Fellowship at The Bunting Institute of Harvard University.	

She has also published scholarly essays on race and incest in American literature.

She lives in the Boston area and is a professor of creative writing at Emerson College.

References

External links
 Official Site
 
 The Bunting Institute

1966 births
Living people
Columbia College (New York) alumni
Emerson College faculty
University of Michigan alumni
American women novelists
20th-century American novelists
21st-century American novelists
21st-century American women writers
20th-century American women writers
20th-century American essayists
21st-century American essayists
Novelists from Massachusetts
American women essayists
American women academics